Katrien Torfs (born 10 November 1987) is a former Belgian football player and international.

Biography 
Born in Leuven, Torfs started at the age of five at Rapide Bertem. She made her transfer to the youth teams of Oud-Heverlee Leuven at the age of 7 where she stage until 2007.

As from 2007 she played for Standard Liège until 2011.

After a short break, she returned to her senior home club Oud-Heverlee Leuven where she played for 2 seasons in the BeNe League.

Champions League 
She played 2 games with Standard Liège in the Champions League. They stranded in the round of 32 against Montpelier. The first game was a 0–0 draw. They lost the second with 1–3. She played in total 127 minutes.

BeNe League 
After she left Standard, she retired from football but when the BeNe League was created, OHL asked her to rejoin the club. In the first season OHL ended 7th with 13 points in BeNe League Red and they had to play in the second stage in BeNe League B, where they ended on the 5th place.

The second and final year she played at OHL in the BeNe League, she only played 1 game for 12 minutes. OHL ended on the 10th place.

Awards 
Champion of Belgium (2): 2009 – 2011
Finalist of the Cup of Belgium  : 2009
Winner of the Super Cup of Belgium (1): 2009
Dubbed Belgian Championship – Super Cup Belgium (1): 2009

Statistics

Club

International

Youth

Senior

References

External links 
 Profile at RBFA
 Profile at uefa.com
 Profile at voetbalkrant.com

Belgian women's footballers
Belgium women's international footballers
Women's association football midfielders
Footballers from Flemish Brabant
Standard Liège (women) players
1987 births
Living people
Oud-Heverlee Leuven (women) players
BeNe League players
Sportspeople from Leuven